is a Japanese actress.

Biography 
She started acting at high school at the age of 15 years.
In 1997 she was selected from 1,789 actresses in auditions and debuted as the lead role in the NHK Asadora Yanchakure, televised nationally from 5 October 1998 to 3 April 1999, spanning 150 episodes. She has since appeared in many popular television and theatrical productions in Japan, including travel programmes and documentaries in more than 15 countries across the world. In 2007, she travelled to Sweden to interview Queen Silvia of Sweden about her commitment to work with dementia and care of the elderly. In addition to acting, since 2001 she has been learning Nihon Buyo (Japanese traditional dance) in the Fujima-ryū, the Iemoto of which is Fujima Kannemon, who is also a Japanese kabuki actor, appearing under the name Onoe Shoroku IV.

In December 2010, she moved to Germany.

Television 
 Asadora Yanchakure (NHK) 1998-1999
 Kinpachi-sensei Part 5 (TBS) 1999-2000
 Nekketsu! Shūsaku ga yuku (TV Asahi) 2000
 Wakaresase-ya (NTV) 2001
 Ten no Hitomi 2 (TV Asahi) 2001
 Emergency Room 24 hours Series 2 (CX) 2001
 Kinpachi-sensei Part 6 (TBS) 2001-2002
 Tokyo Story (Television drama remake) (CX) 2002
 Locker no hanako-san (NHK) 2002
 Mito Kōmon Part 32 (TBS) 2003
 Kaettekita Locker no hanako-san (NHK) 2003
 Taiga dorama Shinsengumi! (NHK) 2004
 The Kawasemi Inn Season 2 (NHK) 2004
 Mito Kōmon Part 33 (TBS) 2004
 Kinpachi-sensei Part 7 (TBS) 2004-2005
 anego (NTV) 2005
 THE WINDS OF GOD (TV Asahi) 2005
 The Kawasemi Inn Season 3 (NHK) 2005
 Kindaichi Case Files (NTV) 2005
 Mei-bugyō! Ōoka Echizen (TV Asahi) 2006
 Keishichō Sōsa-ikka 9 gakari Season 1 (TV Asahi) 2006
 Mito Kōmon Part 36 (TBS) 2006
 Asadora Imo Tako Nankin (NHK) 2006-2007
 Danryū (MBS) 2007
 C.A. to Oyobi! (NTV) 2007
 Mop Girl (TV Asahi) 2007
 Aibou Season 6 (TV Asahi) 2007
 Hataraki Man (NTV) 2007
 Genjūrō hissatsu-ken (TV Tokyo) 2008
 Saturday Night at the Mysteries (ABC) 2008
 Omiya-san Season 6 (TV Asahi) 2009
 Ochaberi (MBS) 2009
 Konkatsu! (CX) 2009
 Saisei no Machi (NHK) 2009
 ROMES 06 (NHK) 2009
 Saturday Night at the Mysteries (ABC) 2010
 Tōbō Bengoshi (CX) 2010
 Keishichō Sōsa-ikka 9 gakari Season 5 (TV Asahi) 2010
 Hotaru no Hikari 2 (NTV) 2010

Film 
 Hotaru no Hikari the movie (location in Rome Italy) 2012

Theatre 
 Tokyo Sundance (Theatre Cocoon, Osaka Kintetsu Theatre, Fukuoka Mielparque Hall) Feb.-Mar. 2001
 Boeing-Boeing (The Globe Tokyo Theatre, Osaka Kintetsu Theatre) Jun.-Jul. 2003
 Star tanjo (Aoyama Theatre) Mar.-Apr. 2004
 Cho-jin (Shimokitazawa Honda Theatre, Osaka Wahha-Kamikata Wahha Hall, Yamatokōriyama kōriyama-jo Hall, Shiga-ken-ritsu Kusatsu Bunka-Geizyutsu-Kaikan) Sep.-Oct. 2004
 Tsubame no iru Eki (The Globe Tokyo Theatre, Osaka Kousei-nenkin-Kaikan Geizyutsu Hall) Sep.-Oct. 2005
 Sakura no Sono (Aoyama round Theatre) Jun.-Jul. 2007
 Love 30 vol.2 (PARCO Theatre, Aichi-ken Kinro-Kaikan, Osaka Theatre Drama City) Aug.-Sep. 2007
 Genroku Meoto Gassen ~Ogata Kōrin and Tayo~ (Osaka Shin-Kabuki-za, Chunichi Theatre, Meiji-za)) Apr. and Jul.-Aug. 2008
 Sakura no Sono (Aoyama round Theatre) Apr. 2009
 Roules of La Cosa Nostra (Shinjuku Theatre Molière) Oct. 2010
 Yoshimoto 100nen Monogatari (Namba ground Kagetsu) Oct. 2012

Concert 
 Tokyo Philharmonic Orchestra  ~Tokyo Opera City Grand Concert Series~ 「Kodomo On・Gaku・Kan 2005」(Tokyo Opera City Concert Hall) 2005

Narration for Documentary 
 Yakusoku ~Nihon-Ichi no Dam ga ubau mono~  Awarded a FNS Documentary Award and nominated for Galaxy Award (Tōkai Television Broadcasting) 2007

Radio Drama 
 Sound drive (NHK FM) 2003
 Fushigi-ya Tosyo-kan (NHK FM) 2004
 Sayonara Birthday (NHK FM) 2006
 Sensuikan Kazoku (NHK FM) 2009

Mobile Phone TV Drama 
 Kamiji Yusuke no Genki no deru Koi (Bee-TV) 2009

External links

Actresses from Gifu Prefecture
1977 births
Living people
Japanese expatriates in Germany
Asadora lead actors